Samuel T. Wright III (born 1955) is a former Associate Justice of the Kentucky Supreme Court. He was elected to the Supreme Court in November 2015, and lost re-election in 2020.

Early life
Wright was born and raised in Letcher County, Kentucky.

Education
He received an associate degree from Hazard Community College and his bachelor's degree from the University of Kentucky. He earned his Juris Doctor from University of Kentucky College of Law.

Judicial career
Wright previously worked as a trial judge for more than 23 years in Letcher County. He was serving in his fourth term as Letcher County Circuit Court judge when he was elected to the Supreme Court.

He was first appointed to fill a vacancy on Circuit Court by Governor Brereton Jones in 1993 and was then elected. Prior to taking the Circuit Court bench, Justice Wright was the District Court judge for Letcher County for a year.

Prior to becoming a judge, Justice Wright was practicing law as an attorney. After graduating law school in 1981, he returned to Eastern Kentucky to join the law firm of Cook and Wright. He went on to open his own law practice in 1989.

Kentucky Supreme Court
In January 2015 Wright filed paperwork to run for a seat on the Kentucky Supreme Court. He was elected on November 3, 2015, defeating his challenger Janet Stumbo, and was sworn in on December 7, 2015. He replaced David Allen Barber, who was appointed in March 2015.

Personal life
Wright and his wife have two sons living in eastern Kentucky. One is a wildlife biologist; as of 2015 the other was studying computer programming.

Electoral history 
Source: Commonwealth of Kentucky, For the office of Justice of the Supreme Court, November 3, 2015

See also 
List of justices of the Kentucky Supreme Court

References

External links
 Official profile of Justice Wright
 
  Sam Wright for Justice, Supreme Court Campaign Website

1955 births
Living people
21st-century American judges
People from Letcher County, Kentucky
Justices of the Kentucky Supreme Court
University of Kentucky College of Law alumni